Joaquín Murillo Pascual (February 27, 1932, Barcelona, Catalonia, Spain – January 10, 2009, Zaragoza, Aragon, Spain) was Spanish ex-footballer who played as a striker.

Formed in the CE Europe from his native Barcelona, in 1954 joined Real Valladolid CF, where he played for three seasons. Then he ended up at Real Zaragoza team in which he scored 113 goals in 178 official matches. With 88 goals in the league, it is the top scorer in the history of Real Zaragoza, after Raul Tamudo is the Catalan player with the most goals in the First Division with 132 goals.

Clubs
Real Valladolid C.F., Spain, 1954–1957
Real Zaragoza, Spain, 1957–1964
C.E. Europa, Spain, 1964–1965

Honours
Real Zaragoza
Copa del Rey: 1964
Inter-Cities Fairs Cup: 1964

References

External links
 Hemeroteca.lavanguardia.com (Spanish)
 Futbol.as.com (Spanish)
 

1932 births
2009 deaths
Spanish footballers
Association football forwards
Real Valladolid players
Real Zaragoza players